Gezende is a village in Mersin Province, Turkey.

Geography 
Gezende is a part of Gülnar district of Mersin Province. At  it is one of the westernmost villages of the province. Göksu River flows just north of the village and Gezende Dam with 159 MW power is almost in the village. The population of the village is 446  as of 2012.

History 
There are ruins dated back to Seljuks (12th-13th centuries). According to town page, there were four guest houses in the village. Such houses imply that there were Middle age education institutions in the village.

Economy 
The village enjoys irrigated farming. Plums and other fruits as well as vegetables are produced. Another economic activity is beehiving (thyme honey).

References

Villages in Gülnar District